Trust Company (also typeset as TRUSTcompany and TRUST*CO) is an American alternative metal band from Prattville, Alabama, United States. Formed in 1997 by lead vocalist Kevin Palmer and drummer Jason Singleton. Trust Company has sold over 1 million albums worldwide.

History

Formation and The Lonely Position of Neutral (1997–2002)
Formed in 1997, Trust Company came together through vocalist/guitarist Kevin Palmer and drummer Jason Singleton. Originally called 41Down, the band then recruited bassist Josh Moates and guitarist James Fukai. After building a local fan-base and releasing a self-titled album as well as a couple demos, the band went on to sign a major label deal with Geffen Records. The band then changed their name to Trust Company to avoid confusion with the Canadian band Sum 41.

The group released its debut album, The Lonely Position of Neutral, on July 23, 2002. The album was well received, with the lead single, "Downfall," gaining heavy exposure through MTV2. Subsequently, the song entered the Billboard Hot 100 singles charts. A second single "Running from Me" followed with more moderate success. "The Fear" was released in 2003 as the album's third single. The Lonely Position of Neutral was certified gold by the RIAA, and the band went on to tour with artists such as Thirty Seconds to Mars and Papa Roach. They also toured with Korn and Disturbed as part of the Pop Sux Tour in 2002.

True Parallels and hiatus (2003–2006)
Trust Company was scheduled to play at Ozzfest 2003 but was forced to back out by their label in order to work on their second album, True Parallels, which was belatedly released on March 22, 2005, after an 8–10 month delay. Several months prior to the album's release, original bassist Josh Moates left the group and was replaced by Walker Warren. Despite little promotion from their label, the album entered the Billboard album charts at No. 32, and has gone on to sell in excess of 200,000 copies. The first and only single from the album, "Stronger," made a moderate impact on mainstream rock radio. According to drummer Jason Singleton on the band's website message board, the second single may have been "The War is Over."

In August 2005, the band decided to take a break and focus on side projects and spend some time at home. Soon after the break, Palmer and original bassist Josh Moates came together to form a new band called Amity Lane. The band released its debut album The Sound of Regret on October 31, 2006. In an interview with IndyConcerts.com following their show in Indianapolis on April 6, 2011, Kevin Palmer was quoted as saying the Amity Lane album was never intended to be released. The whole album was put up as just a fun side project and not even studio produced. Palmer went on to say he and Moates recorded the whole album on a computer. Jason Singleton played drums for several bands in Montgomery, including Arm in Arms, The Spicolis, and The Escape Frame. James Fukai reunited with his old band, Hematovore.

Reunion, Dreaming in Black and White and inactivity (2007–present)
On August 11, 2007, the four original members of the band – Palmer,  Moates, Singleton, and Fukai – announced they were reuniting and planned two reunion shows in Montgomery, Alabama and that they will be writing and recording a new album for release sometime in 2008. On March 18, 2008, the band posted two new songs titled "Waking Up" and "Stumbling" on their Myspace page. The band stated in a blog that these were demos and may be re-recorded. They later announced that they would be handing out CDs with previously unreleased or rare material from past years at concerts with the purchase of a T-shirt.

Josh Moates chose to leave the band and was replaced by bassist Eric Salter. Eric Salter left the band in 2009 and was replaced by Wes Cobb.

Trust Company carried out a small US tour at the end of 2010 to promote their new single, "Heart in My Hands", from their third studio album, Dreaming in Black and White, which was released on March 8, 2011. The lead single was released on iTunes on October 5, 2010. In late October 2010, the band finished the music video for "Heart in My Hands" and the video premiered on Vevo on December 15, 2010. The music video features bass player Rachel Bolan of heavy metal band Skid Row. The band went on a two-month tour with Drowning Pool on the promotion of the album.

Trust Company's social media has been virtually untouched since 2015, except for on March 3, 2017, when the original unreleased music video for "Stronger" was posted on Facebook, and a post made on Twitter on March 7, 2017, marking 15 years since The Lonely Position of Neutral was released.

On October 16, 2017 the official Trust Company Twitter account replied to a fan and stated that a new album is currently in the process of being written. After another two years of inactivity, the band's Twitter again confirmed that a new album was in the process of being written on February 22, 2020, although the band stated that it did not have plans to tour at that time.

On December 23, 2022, the band announced that the original lineup will play at Blue Ridge Rock Festival 2023.

Members
Current
 Kevin Palmer – lead vocals, rhythm guitar 
 James Fukai – lead guitar, backing vocals 
 Jason Singleton – drums, backing vocals 
 Josh Moates – bass 

Former
 Walker Warren – bass 
 Eric Salter – bass 
 Wes Cobb – bass, backing vocals

Discography
Studio albums

Compilation album
Via Myspace, Trust Company gave their fans the opportunity to obtain a previously unreleased LP for free after purchasing a T-shirt from their online store. The album contains rare demos and tracks not included in their previous two albums. The track listing is as follows:

1. "Stronger (Piano with drum loop version)" 
2. "Closer" 
3. "I Can't Breathe" 
4. "Seasons Change" 
5. "Today" 
6. "Moving in Circles" 
7. "Hover (Quiet Mix)" (Underworld soundtrack) 
8. "Sterilize" 
9. "Something Perfect (New version)" 
10. "Losing View" 
11. "Rock the Casbah" (The Clash cover) 
12. "Time After Time" (Cyndi Lauper cover)

Singles

References

External links
 Trust Company on Myspace

American alternative metal musical groups
American hard rock musical groups
American post-grunge musical groups
American nu metal musical groups
Heavy metal musical groups from Alabama
Musical groups established in 1997
Musical groups disestablished in 2005
Musical groups reestablished in 2007
Musical groups disestablished in 2011